Scott Milhouse Gimple (born March 29, 1971) is an American writer for both comics and television. He is known for his work as a writer and producer for Fillmore!, Life, FlashForward, Chase, and The Walking Dead, and served as showrunner for The Walking Dead from seasons 4 through 8.

Early life
Gimple grew up in Berkeley Heights, New Jersey and graduated from Governor Livingston High School. He graduated from the University of Southern California's School of Cinema-Television.

Career
Gimple was a writer on NBC's Life and Fox TV's Drive, and ABC's FlashForward. He co-wrote the script of Ghost Rider: Spirit of Vengeance alongside Seth Hoffman and David S. Goyer.

In 2011, he joined AMC's The Walking Dead as a producer and writer for the second season. He wrote "Save the Last One", as well as the critically acclaimed "Pretty Much Dead Already", and "18 Miles Out" (with showrunner Glen Mazzara).

In January 2013, Gimple was named showrunner of The Walking Dead, replacing Glen Mazzara. He served as showrunner from the fourth season to the eighth season. During his tenure, he also became an executive producer for Fear the Walking Dead. Gimple left his role as showrunner in 2018 to become the chief content officer for The Walking Dead television series franchise. 
Gimple has also worked on Disney's Pepper Ann and as a writer for The Simpsons comics, including editing the Simpsons' Episode Guidebook "The Simpsons Forever!: A Complete Guide to Our Favorite Family... Continued". He created the cartoon Fillmore! and the comic book Heroes Anonymous with Bill Morrison.

Personal life
He married actress Julia Wackenheim on August 30, 2009 and they have a son; his wife converted to Judaism upon marrying him.

Filmography

Film

Television
Production

Writer

References

External links 
 

1971 births
Living people
Jewish American screenwriters
American male screenwriters
American television writers
American male television writers
People from Berkeley Heights, New Jersey
Showrunners
USC School of Cinematic Arts alumni
American voice directors
Screenwriters from New Jersey
21st-century American Jews
Television producers from New Jersey
Disney Television Animation people